I Am Not Pan Jinlian, known in English as I Am Not Madame Bovary, is a 2016 Chinese comedy film directed by Feng Xiaogang and written by Liu Zhenyun, based on Liu's 2012 novel I Did Not Kill My Husband. The film stars Fan Bingbing, Zhang Jiayi, Yu Hewei, Dong Chengpeng and Guo Tao. It was selected to be screened in the Special Presentations section at the 2016 Toronto International Film Festival. and won the award for Best Achievement in Directing (Feng Xiaogang) at the Asia Pacific Screen Awards. It was released in China on 18 November 2016.

Synopsis
The main protagonist, Li Xuelian, is a woman who divorces her husband in order to side-step Chinese law, which states that married couples can only own one property.  In order to purchase another property, Li and her husband concoct a plan to divorce so that they can buy a second property.  However, in the process of this, her now ex-husband marries another woman and denies ever agreeing to such a deal with Li.  To further outrage and distance himself, he accuses Li of sleeping with other men (prostitution/being Madame Bovary).  Li, outraged by this, goes to the local authorities to nullify the divorce so that she may legitimately divorce her husband.  Authorities are puzzled by this as Li is already divorced.  Li explains her principled approach, first to the local police that she and her husband agreed to divorce under the guise of buying property, but now she wishes to undertake a legitimate divorce.  Li crusades for her cause, escalating her issue through each bureaucratic step in the system, from the local police, to local judiciary, to local magistrate, then to the Provincial authorities.

During Li's journey, she tries to hire her friends as hitmen to kill her ex-husband, is accused by her ex-husband of fooling around with other men, is arrested and sent to re-education camps, falsely led into an intimate relationship with a man in an effort by local authorities of ceasing her crusade, goes all the way to Beijing to protest her principled stance on nullifying her divorce.  During her persistent crusade, her ex-husband dies, leading Li to lament over her, now, inability to seek retribution for her ex-husband's illicit affair and branding her a prostitute.

The movie concludes with Li settling alone in Beijing, running a noodle restaurant where she encounters one of the local officials who impeded her during her early crusade.  She recounts her tale with the official (who was fired as a result of her crusade) and reveals that she initially divorced not to buy property, but so they could have two children.  Li was pregnant at the time of the divorce and a divorce would mean she and her ex could "re"-marry and have another child.  However, during her divorce and crusade, she had a miscarriage and lost the baby.  The movie concludes with Li accepting her fate and life for what it is and lets go of her angst and hate.

Cast
 Fan Bingbing as Li Xuelian, a village woman
 Da Peng as Wang Gongdao, the judge
 Yin Yuanzhang as Gu Daxing
 Feng Enhe as retired Chief Justice
 Liu Xin as Justice Xun
 Zhao Yi as Police Chief
 Zhao Lixin as County Chief Shi Weimin
 Jiang Yongbo as Mayor Cai
 Zhang Yi as Jia Congming
 Liu Hua as Lao Hu
 Li Zonghan as Qin Yuhe
 Guo Tao as Zhao Datou, Xuelian's classmate
 Huang Jianxin as Governor Chu 
 Gao Ming as leader 
 Yu Hewei as Zheng Zhong 
 Zhang Jiayi as the magistrate 
 Tian Xiaojie as Secretary of Mayor 
 Li Chen as Police officer
 Hu Ming as Hospital driver
 Fan Wei as Guo Nong, orchard owner 
 Feng Xiaogang (uncredited) as narrator

Production
I Am Not Madame Bovary is Feng Xiaogang, Liu Zhenyun and Fan Bingbing's second collaboration together, twelve years after their first, Cell Phone.

On 14 March 2016, a trailer was released via the film's producers.

Release
The film was released theatrically on 18 November 2016.

Box office
The film has grossed  in China. It has grossed  worldwide.

Reception

Critical reception
On review aggregator website Rotten Tomatoes, the film holds an approval rating of 86% based on 49 reviews, and an average rating of 6.7/10. The website's critical consensus reads, "I Am Not Madame Bovarys sly social commentary and well-constructed story anchor director Feng Xiaogang's visually experimental approach." On Metacritic, the film has a weighted average score of 65 out of 100, based on 13 critics, indicating "generally favorable reviews".

Accolades

References

External links
 
 
 

2016 films
2016 comedy films
Chinese comedy films
Films based on Chinese novels
Films directed by Feng Xiaogang
Films with screenplays by Liu Zhenyun
Huayi Brothers films
Asian Film Award for Best Film winners